Meydan TV is a Berlin-based Azerbaijani non-profit media organization. Founded by dissident blogger and former political prisoner Emin Milli in 2013, Meydan TV publishes news in Azerbaijani, English, and Russian. In May 2013, Meydan TV announced plans for broadcasting simultaneously through the Turkish Türksat communications. The word "meydan" means town square in Azerbaijani.

News coverage
Meydan TV gained prominence for its reports and online broadcasts on corruption, human rights and other issues in Azerbaijan, which have been used by the international media, particularly during the 2015 European Games in Baku when several reporters and foreign observers were barred from the country. Meydan TV is a partner of the Organized Crime and Corruption Reporting Project. Several reports of Meydan TV were made with the support of European Endowment for Democracy (EED) organization.

During the 2015 European Games Azerbaijani channel Lider TV interviewed a local man who posed as a foreigner in order to create a "provocation". After Meydan TV identified the interviewee as Seymur Seferov, a displaced Azerbaijani citizen from the Jabrayil Rayon, the Lider TV report on purported foreigner went viral in Azerbaijani social media. In 2015 it was reported that several Meydan TV journalists were prosecuted, arrested or received travel bans (including Aynura Ismayil, Shirin Abbasov, Ayten Farhadova and Aysel Umudova). According to Ali Hasanov, Meydan TV website and several other media outlets were not following the accreditation rules for foreign media representatives in Azerbaijan approved on 18 March 2015.

On 9 April 2016, Azerbaijani website Haqqin.az accused Meydan TV of overestimation of Azerbaijani casualties during the 2016 Armenian–Azerbaijani clashes. Meydan TV which put the number of military casualties at 94 instead of officially stated 31 compiled the list according to posts in social networks. Haqqin.az stated that soldier Aidyn Hasanov listed by Meydan TV among those killed was actually treated in a military hospital for arm injury.

References

External links
Official website

Azerbaijani news websites
Television channels and stations established in 2013
Internet properties established in 2013
Non-profit organisations based in Berlin
Online nonprofit organizations
Free Media Awards winners